Kulkarni  is a family name native to the Indian state of Maharashtra. The name "Kulkarni" is a combination of two words (kula and karni). Kula means "family", and Karanika means "archivist". Historically, Kulkarni was the title given to the village record keeper.

As per the historian P.J. Marshall, both Kulkarni and Deshpande were specialized scribes who "served great households and enhanced other, familiar, administrative mechanisms at their disposal".

History 
Before British rule, the Maharashtra region was divided into many revenue divisions. The medieval equivalent of a county or district was the pargana. The chief of the pargana was called Deshmukh and record keepers were called Deshpande. The lowest administrative unit was the village. Village society in Marathi areas included the Patil or the head of the village, collector of revenue, and Kulkarni, the village record-keeper. These were hereditary positions. The Patil usually came from the Maratha caste. The Kulkarni was usually from literate communities such as Brahmin (mainly from Deshastha and the Karhade sub-castes) and CKP castes. The Kulkarni operated at the village level but at a pargana level, the recordkeeper had titles such as Deshkulkarni, Deshpande, or Nadkarni (in Karnataka). The Kulkarni watans (land rights) were abolished in 1950.

Notable Kulkarni

Saints 
 Dnyaneshwar: Pre-sainthood name: Dnyandev Kulkarni 1275–1296
 Eknath: Pre-sainthood name: Eknāth Kulkarni : 1533–1599
 Samarth Ramdas: Pre-sainthood name: Narayan Kulkarni (Thosar): 1608–1681
 Nivruttinath: Pre-sainthood name: Nivrutti Kulkarni : Elder brother and teacher of Dnyaneshwar
 Sopan: Pre-sainthood name: Sopan Kulkarni
 Muktabai: Pre-sainthood name: Mukta Kulkarni
 Mahipati: Chronicler of many Indian saints, author of the Bhaktavijaya: (1715–1790)

Historic Figures 
 Ramchandra Pant Amatya: 1650–1716 The third Peshwa, Finance Minister (Amatya) to Emperor (Chhatrapati) Shivaji and Imperial Regent (Hukumat Panah)
 Parshuram Trimbak Kulkarni: 1660–1718 Held post of Pant Pratinidhi, the fifth Peshwa and the founder of Aundh and Vishalgad princely states.

Entertainment 
 Atul Kulkarni: Marathi film and theater actor
 Anurag Kulkarni: Indian playback singer 
 Chandrakant Kulkarni: Film director
 Dhondutai Kulkarni: Vocalist of the Jaipur-Atrauli Ghara
 Girish Kulkarni: Marathi film actor
 Mamta Kulkarni: Bollywood actress
 Mrinal Dev-Kulkarni: Marathi television actress.
 Saleel Kulkarni: Marathi singer and composer
 Sameep Kulkarni: International Artist and Sitarist
 Sandeep Kulkarni: Marathi actor
 Sonali Kulkarni: Bollywood actress 
 Sonalee Kulkarni: Marathi film actress
 Umesh Vinayak Kulkarni: Film Director
 Harshavardhan Kulkarni: Filmmaker

Literature 
 G. A. Kulkarni (1923–1987): Short story writer

Sports 
 Nilesh Kulkarni: Indian cricketer
 Raju Kulkarni: Former Indian cricketer
 Shubhangi Kulkarni: Indian woman cricketer and secretary of the Women's Cricket Association of India
 Vineet Kulkarni: Indian cricket umpire and member of the International Cricket Council's International Panel of Umpires and Referees
Dhawal Kulkarni Indian cricketer, fast bowler from Mumbai.

Professionals 
 Radhika Kulkarni: Indian and American operations researcher, president of INFORMS
 Ravi S. Kulkarni (born 1942): Indian mathematician
 Sudha Kulkarni Murty: Kannada writer, Founder of Sudha Murty Foundation and wife of Narayan Murthy
 Sri Preston Kulkarni (born 1978): American diplomat and politician
 Srinivas Kulkarni:Shrinivas Ramchandra Kulkarni (born 4 October 1956) is a US-based astronomer born and raised in India.

See also 

 Marathi people
 Deshpande
 Patwari
 Patil
 Indian honorifics
 Indian feudalism
 Deshmukh
 Jagirdar
 Lambardar
 Mankari
 Sarpanch
 Zaildar
 Zamindar

References 

Surnames
Indian surnames
Indian feudalism
Indian words and phrases
Marathi-language surnames